Andrew M. Mead (born 1952) is a justice of the Maine Supreme Judicial Court since 2007. His current term expires in 2021.

Mead attended the University of Maine and New York Law School.

He has been a member of the Bangor law firms of Paine, Lynch & Weatherbee and Mitchell & Stearns. He is a past President of the Maine State Bar Association. He was appointed to the Maine District Court in 1990 and the Maine Superior Court in 1992. He served as chief justice of the Maine Superior Court from 1999 to 2001. He was appointed to the Maine Supreme Judicial Court in 2007. He has served as judicial liaison to the Maine Rules of Evidence Advisory Committee and chaired the Task Force on Electronic Court Records. He has been active in a number of court technology and jury reform initiatives. He is a member of the University of Maine adjunct faculty.

References

External links
 Biographies of the Maine Supreme Judicial Court justices
 Cleaves Law Library biography of Andrew Mead
 Mead Profile on Judgepedia

Notes
 Material on this page was initially imported from the Judgepedia article on Andrew Mead, and has been expressly released under the GFDL per Judgepedia:Copyrights.

|-

1952 births
Living people
University of Maine alumni
New York Law School alumni
Maine lawyers
21st-century American judges
Justices of the Maine Supreme Judicial Court
People from Bangor, Maine
University of Maine School of Law faculty